Imran Rasul  (born 29 July 1974) is a professor of economics at the University College London, managing editor of the Journal of the European Economic Association, and co-director of the Centre for the Microeconomic Analysis of Public Policy at the Institute for Fiscal Studies. His research interests include labour, development and public economics and he is considered to be one of the leaders within social norms and capital economics.

After completing his masters at Oxford University in 1997, he continued his studies at the London School of Economics under the supervision of Professor Timothy Besley, achieving his doctorate in 2003 with a thesis entitled "Non-contractibilities in the household: Theory and evidence".

Awards and honours 
In 2007 Rasul was awarded the IZA Institute of Labor Economics Young Economist Prize.

In 2019 Rasul and Oriana Bandiera were jointly awarded the Yrjö Jahnsson Award in Economics. The award is given to a European economist that is no older than 45 years old and has made a contribution in theoretical and applied research that is significant to economies in Europe.

Rasul was elected as a Fellow of the British Academy (FBA) in 2019 and fellow of the Econometric Society in 2020.

He was appointed Officer of the Order of the British Empire (OBE) in the 2020 Birthday Honours for services to social sciences.

References 

British economists
Living people
1974 births
Alumni of the University of Oxford
Alumni of the London School of Economics
Fellows of the British Academy
Officers of the Order of the British Empire
Academics of University College London
Fellows of the Econometric Society